The Turning Point is a 1945 Soviet, Russian-language war film directed by Fridrikh Ermler based on a screenplay by Boris Chirskov. The film was one of the earlier Palme d'Or winners of 1946. It was produced by GOSKINO at Kinostudiya Lenfilm (Lenfilm Studio), distributed in the US by Artkino Pictures, and restored in 1967 at Lenfilm Studio. The film's working title was General of the Army.

Cast
 Mikhail Derzhavin, Sr as Col. Gen. Muravyev
 Petr Andrievsky as Col. Gen. Vinogradov
 Yuri Tolubeyev as Lavrov
 Andrei Abrikosov as Lt. Gen. Krivenko
 Aleksandr Zrazhevsky as Lt. Gen. Panteleev
 Nikolay Korn
 Mark Bernes as Minutka Driver
 Vladimir Marev
 Pavel Volkov as Stepan

References

External links
 

1945 films
Palme d'Or winners
Lenfilm films
Soviet black-and-white films
Films directed by Fridrikh Ermler
1940s Russian-language films
1940s war drama films
Soviet World War II films
Soviet war drama films
1945 drama films